Barras is a surname. Notable people with the surname include:

 Alexander Barras (1914–1986), Australian cricketer
 Charlotte Barras (born 1982), English rugby union player
 Claude Barras (born 1973), Swiss director
 Gérard Barras (born 1937), Swiss athlete
 Jacques-Melchior Saint-Laurent, Comte de Barras (1719–1793), French naval officer
 Martin Barras (born 1962), French-Canadian cycling coach
 Paul Barras (1755–1829), French politician
 Romain Barras (born 1980), French decathlete
 Sébastien Barras (1653–1703), French painter and engraver
 Sid Barras (born 1948), English cyclist
 Taylor Barras (born 1957), American politician
 Tom Barras (born 1978), English cyclist
 Tony Barras (born 1971), English footballer